The Los Angeles Police Department Cadet Program, known informally as the LAPD Cadets, is a cadet program run and sponsored by the Los Angeles Police Department for youth aged 13 to 17. The cadet program is similar in nature to the police explorer programs that are present in many police departments through the Learning for Life program.

Cadets volunteer in several different ways for the police department, including taking part in ride alongs, crowd control, charity assistance, working in stations, and other tasks. The cadet program has posts at all of the LAPD's 21 regional divisions, South and Central Traffic divisions, LAPD Headquarters, and a post in partnership with the YMCA. The University of Southern California and Los Angeles Airport Police both host affiliated cadet posts as well, and as of 2014 there were 5,000 cadets.

History
The LAPD program was formerly associated with Learning for Life, but it was withdrawn from the program and reorganized as an independent organization in 2007 after the police commission broke off their partnership with the Boy Scouts of America over their policy of barring gays, atheists and agnostics from being troop leaders.

The newer cadet program shifted focus from the old explorer program, which focused primarily on preparing cadets for a career in law enforcement, to a broader program that is designed to give cadets a solid foundation in life and to help them prepare for whatever careers they choose by offering things like tutoring and college scholarships to different cadets in need of assistance. The cadets complete courses not only on law enforcement but also on citizenship, leadership, financial literacy and other different skill sets.

Membership
In order to join the cadet program a person must be between the ages of 13 and 17, maintain a 2.0 grade point average, have no serious criminal record, obtain a medical examination, and complete the cadet academy.

Organization and Structure 
Each Cadet Post is run by two Youth Services Officers, who are sworn police officers. At each post, a staff of senior cadets mentors and teaches the more junior cadets. While cadets have, and can promote to, different ranks, cadet rank is designed to provide mentorship and leadership, and cannot issue orders or impose punishment.

Training
Recruits must attend the Cadet Leadership Academy, which lasts for fifteen consecutive Saturdays. Recruits learn basic law enforcement skills through classroom learning, physical training, and drill. Classes taught at the academy include criminal law, public speaking, conflict resolution, and demonstrations by SWAT, K-9, and Bomb Squad units.

Activities
Cadets attend meetings once a week for additional training and other law enforcement-related activities. In addition to meeting weekly, cadets volunteer to assist law enforcement officers in coordinating and securing special activities, or take part in additional training opportunities, including:

March of Dimes
Division Picnics/Holiday Parties
National Night Out
SWAT Fitness Challenge
The Academy Awards
Hollywood Christmas Parade
LA Marathon
Dodgers Nights
Division Vice Operations
Working at Division front desks
Officer oriented training for bike patrol

Controversy
In June 2017, three cadets were arrested after they led police in a car chase using stolen department vehicles, and crashed two of them during the pursuit. Investigators later discovered a ring of cadets had been stealing and using department vehicles and other equipment for at least two months prior to their discovery; ultimately, seven cadets were arrested. During the investigation into the thefts, investigators discovered evidence of a sexual relationship between a fifteen year old female cadet, who was one of the cadets arrested for the theft of department property, and a thirty-one year old police officer, who was subsequently arrested and charged with sexual assault. Following the investigation, the sexual assault victim announced her intention to file a suit against the city for negligence.

See also
California Cadet Corps

References

External links
LAPD Cadets Official Website

Law enforcement in the United States
Youth organizations based in California